Dendrobium convexum, commonly known as the piggyback orchid, is an epiphytic orchid in the family Orchidaceae. It has a creeping, brittle root, erect pseudobulbs with a single leaf on the top and one or two cream-coloured, short-lived flowers with a red and yellow labellum. It is native to Southeast Asia, New Guinea and tropical North Queensland, Australia.

Description
Flowering occurs sporadically and the flowers open for less than a day.

Taxonomy and naming
The piggyback orchid was first formally described in 1825 by Carl Ludwig Blume who gave it the name Desmotrichum convexum. He published the description in his book Bijdragen tot de flora van Nederlandsch Indië. In 1831, John Lindley changed the name to Dendrobium convexum. The specific epithet (convexum) is a Latin word meaning "arched outward" or "protuberant".

Distribution and habitat
Dendrobium convexum grows in mangroves, humid areas of scrub, forest and rainforest mainly on rough-barked trees. It occurs in Malaysia, Thailand, Indonesia, New Guinea and on the Cape York Peninsula as far south as Innisfail, Australia.

References

convexum
Orchids of Queensland
Orchids of New Guinea
Orchids of Indonesia
Orchids of Asia
Orchids of Malaysia
Plants described in 1825
Taxa named by Carl Ludwig Blume